This list of islands of the Haparanda archipelago includes the many islands, large and small, in the Swedish Haparanda archipelago in the north of the Bothnian Bay.
They are part of the larger archipelago that encompasses islands around the northern end of the bay.

The Swedish Haparanda Archipelago National Park lies within the Haparanda group of islands, bordering the Finnish Bothnian Bay National Park. It includes the larger islands of Sandskär and Seskar Furö, and some smaller islands and skerries. 
All of these islands have emerged in the last 1,500 years as the bed of the bay has risen.
Islands in Haparanda archipelago include:

 Abborrgrundet 
 Ala Penno 
 Äimä 
 Björn sten 
 Blåsut
 Byskär 
 Dagsten 
 Enskär 
 Etukari 
 Eva 
 Granholmen 
 Granvik 
 Grusbrännan 
 Gunnaren 
 Hamngrundet 
 Hamngrundet 
 Hamppuleiviskä 
 Hanhinkari 
 Hargrundet 
 Harrinkrunni 
 Haru 
 Hasu 
 Hietasaari 
 Honkasaarenkrunni 
 Honkasaari 
 Horden 
 Huitori 
 Huitorin Ulkokari 
 Huitorintöyrä 
 Hylkiletto 
 Hyyppä 
 Hälskerinkrunni 
 Höynänkari (north) 
 Höynänkari (south) 
 Islandet 
 Iso Lehtikari 
 Isokivenkari 
 Isokrunni 
 Joutokrunni 
 Juopalla 
 Kaitta 
 Kataja
 Kajava 
 Kalkkikari 
 Kalkkikari 
 Kalliohasu 
 Katajankrunni 
 Kelkkaletto 
 Keräsniemenkari 
 Keski Penno 
 Klauksenkari 
 Klaus 
 Koijukari 
 Koijuluoto 
 Kokkotöyrä 
 Korkea 
 Kourinkrunni 
 Kraaseli 
 Kraaseligrundet 
 Kraaselikrunni 
 Kråkholmarna 
 Kuninkaankari 
 Kurikanmatalat 
 Kurikka 
 Kutarna 
 Kuusiriskilö 
 Kuusitiipuri 
 Laahaja 
 Laitakari 
 Legionen 
 Lehmäkari 
 Lehtitiipuri 
 Leiskeri 
 Lellikrunni 
 Leppikari
 Leppäriskilö 
 Letonkluppi 
 Letonkrunni 
 Letto 
 Liipa 
 Lill-Austi 
 Lilla Almsten 
 Lilla Harrsten 
 Lilla Hepokari 
 Lilla Vasti 
 Länsikrunni 
 Lådan 
 Långören 
 Löngrunden 
 Mali 
 Matalinkari 
 Meriklupu 
 Mustakari 
 Nidunkari 
 Nissu 
 Norrviksgrundet 
 Nuottalahenkari 
 Nälkäkrunni 
 Ostgrundet 
 Östra Knivskär 
 Östra Launinkari 
 Öystinkari
 Paha 
 Paljas 
 Pensaskari 
 Pihjalakari 
 Pikku Lehtikari 
 Pikku Tervakari 
 Pikkukrunni 
 Pirttiluoto 
 Piskan 
 Pitkäkari 
 Pohjaskluppi 
 Pohjaskrunni 
 Pojkarna 
 Prokko 
 Puukko 
 Puukkonkrunni 
 Pöllö 
 Rajakari 
 Rautakrunni 
 Rautaletto 
 Remu 
 Revässaari 
 Riekonkari 
 Riitakrunni 
 Riskilö 
 Ristikari 
 Räiskä 
 Salakrunni 
 Saltgrundet  
 Sandskär
 Santasaari 
 Sarven Riskilö 
 Sarvenkataja 
 Satula 
 Selkäkari 
 Seskar Furö
 Seskarö
 Skomakaren 
 Skratten 
 Sprallen 
 Stenungarna 
 Stor-Austi 
 Stora Almsten 
 Stora Harrsten 
 Stora Hamnskär 
 Stora Hepokari 
 Stora Vasti 
 Svartsten 
 Säivisklubbarna 
 Sinnerstenarna 
 Sipi 
 Sölkäkari 
 Sölkäkari 
 Sölkäkarinkrunni 
 Taipaleenkari 
 Tallrikarna 
 Tantamanni 
 Tervakari 
 Tervaletto 
 Tervasaarenkrunni 
 Tiilikrunni 
 Tirro 
 Tomten 
 Torne-Furö 
 Torne-Furögrund 
 Torvikari 
 Töyrä 
 Vasikka 
 Vasikkasaari 
 Vasikkasaari (Nikkala) 
 Västra Knivskär 
 Vettarna 
 Viinalanmatala 
 Vikaren 
 Vähä Lehtikari 
 Vågören 
 Ykspihlaja 
 Yli Penno 
 Ylikari (north) 
 Ylikari (south)

See also
List of islands of Bothnian Bay

References

Haparanda
Haparanda
Haparanda